The Harker Building is an historic structure in southwest Portland, Oregon. The building was completed in 1878, and was soon occupied by the Oregon Conservatory of Music. A United Brethren congregation purchased the building in 1918 and created a Chinese Mission on the second level. Thomas Lauderdale purchased the building in 2001, after initially renting the space, and has since hosted many events. The phrase "Je ne veux pas travailler" is now written on the exterior. The cast-iron building has also been used by the Western Picture Frame Company and for Pink Martini rehearsals.

References

External links

 

1878 establishments in Oregon
Buildings and structures completed in 1878
Buildings and structures in Portland, Oregon
Southwest Portland, Oregon